The Farman F.31 was a French fighter prototype of the 1910s, the second foray into fighter design by Farman, a firm more usually associated with bombers. The project was short-lived, lasting only 3 months.

Development
The F.31 was a two-seat fighter, designed around the Liberty 12 engine. It was exceptionally angular, and equi-span with the fuselage mounted between its two bays.

Operational history
The sole prototype was completed and first flown in summer 1918. Testing was still ongoing in November 1918, when the Armistice put an end to the project and no further development continued.

Specifications

References

Bibliography

Further reading

1910s French fighter aircraft
F.0031
Aircraft first flown in 1918